Fontenay-le-Comte (Poitevin: Funtenaes or Fintenè) is a commune and subprefecture in the Vendée department in the Pays de la Loire region of Western France. In 2018, it had a population of 13,302, while its functional area had a population of 41,273.

Geography
The river Vendée flows through the town.

History
Fontenay was in existence as early as the time of the Gauls. The affix of comte is said to have been applied to it when it was taken by King Louis IX from the family of Lusignan and given to his brother Alphonse, count of Poitou, under whom it became capital of Bas-Poitou. Ceded to the Plantagenets by the Treaty of Brétigny, in 1360 it was retaken in 1372 by Duguesclin. It suffered repeated capture during the Religious Wars of the 16th century, was dismantled in 1621 and was occupied both by the Republicans and the Royalist Vendeans during the Revolt in the Vendée (1793). From 1790 to 1806 it was capital of the Vendée department.

Population

Miscellaneous
At Maison Laval on rue Rabelais, a townhouse built at the end of the 18th Century, Emperor Napoleon 1st and his wife, Joséphine, spent the night of 7–8 August 1808. On their way from Rochefort to Nantes, they had stopped off in the Bas-Poitou capital of Fontenay-le-Comte where they were the guests of Mayor Laval who, to give them a dignified welcome, had prepared a triumphal arch over the Pont Neuf bridge. That night, the Emperor learned of the defeat of General Dupont at Bailem. The General's surrender, which seriously compromised the French army's position in Spain, threw the Emperor into a deep rage. If word is to be believed, the Emperor smashed an earthenware vase placed in front of him.

Personalities
François Rabelais (1493–1553) was a Franciscan friar at Fontenay-le-Comte, where he studied Greek and Latin, as well as science, philology, and law.
Georges Simenon (1903–1989)  the Belgian writer, author of the Maigret series and other books, stayed at the Chateau de Terreneuve during the war.  Several stories are based in the Vendée, and at least one in Fontenay.  There is a Simenon tour.

Fontenay-le-Comte was the birthplace of:
Augustine Allix (1823–1901), singer, pianist and teacher
Thérèse-Mirza Allix (1816–1882), artist 
Barnabé Brisson (1531–1591), jurist and politician
Mathurin Jacques Brisson (1723–1806), zoologist and natural philosopher.
Michel Crépeau (1930–1999), politician
Jamy Gourmaud (1964–), journalist
Frederic Mazella (1976–), an entrepreneur and funder of BlaBlaCar
François Viète (1540–1603), mathematician

Main sights

Twin towns - sister cities
Fontenay-le-Comte is twinned with:

 Crevillent, Spain
 Diosig, Romania
 Gaoua, Burkina Faso
 Krotoszyn, Poland
 Palatine, United States

See also
Communes of the Vendée department

References

External links

Official website of the town
Heraldry of the town

Communes of Vendée
Subprefectures in France
Poitou